Benny Persson is a Swedish football manager.

Coaching career
Persson managed Brommapojkarna during four seasons until 2003. He then managed FC Väsby United and Syrianska FC. In the summer of 2005, he took over Djurgården/Älvsjö. In late 2007, Persson took over AIK women's team He left AIK after having finished fourth in the 2008 Damallsvenskan.

References

Swedish football managers
IF Brommapojkarna managers
AFC Eskilstuna managers
Syrianska FC managers
Djurgårdens IF Fotboll (women) managers
AIK Fotboll (women) managers
Year of birth missing (living people)
Place of birth missing (living people)
Living people
Damallsvenskan managers